Solange Nunes Bibas (Belém, Pará, 1918 — São Paulo, São Paulo, August 29, 1982) was a Brazilian sports journalist. He worked at A Gazeta Esportiva and covered the 1958 and 1982 football World Cups. In the 1982 one, he was appointed as the official redactor of the Brazilian Football Confederation.

A couple of months after his death, a street in Tatuapé district in São Paulo was named after him.

Bibliography 
 As Copas Que Ninguém Viu (The Cups Nobody Saw) (Editora Planeta, 1982)

References 

1918 births
1982 deaths
Brazilian non-fiction writers
Brazilian journalists
Brazilian sports journalists
People from Belém
20th-century journalists